The final of the Men's Triple Jump event at the 1982 European Championships in Athens, Greece was held on 10 September 1982.

Medalists

Abbreviations
All results shown are in metres

Records

Final

Participation
According to an unofficial count, 12 athletes from 8 countries participated in the event.

 (1)
 (1)
 (2)
 (1)
 (3)
 (1)
 (2)
 (1)

See also
 1980 Men's Olympic Triple Jump (Moscow)
 1983 Men's World Championships Triple Jump (Helsinki)
 1984 Men's Olympic Triple Jump (Los Angeles)

References

 Results

Triple jump
Triple jump at the European Athletics Championships